Eupithecia brandti is a moth in the family Geometridae. It is found in Iran (Fars).

The wingspan is about 17 mm. The forewings are light ochreous, but the medial area is darker, rather light brown with broad antemedial and postmedial transverse lines divided by a whitish medial fascia. The hindwings are paler, with a broad brownish yellow postmedial line and a light ochreous terminal area.

Etymology
The species is named in honour of the brothers Fred and Wilhelm Brandt.

References

Moths described in 2012
brandti
Moths of the Middle East